Largo Island is an elongated island,  in extent, which is the largest of the Duroch Islands, Graham Land, Antarctica. The Chilean Antarctic Expedition, 1947–48, charted the feature as three islands to which the personal names Rozas, Swett, and Horn were applied. It was charted as one island by Martin Halpern, leader of the University of Wisconsin geological party in this area, 1961–62, who reported the name "Largo" (meaning long) to be the only one used by Chilean officials at the nearby General Bernardo O'Higgins Station.

Several rocks in the water off Largo Island have been charted and named by the Chilean Antarctic Expedition. It is named for First Lieutenant Custodio Labbé Lippi, navigation officer of the transport ship Angamos. Vidaurre Rock breaks the surface at low water just 0.05 nautical miles (0.1 km) east of the main group of the Acuña Rocks.

See also 
List of Antarctic and sub-Antarctic islands

References

Islands of the Duroch Islands